Stefan Zečević (born 3 April 1993) is a Serbian professional basketball player for Éanna Basketball Club of the Super League. Standing at 6 ft 6 in (1.98 m), he plays at the small forward position.

Early life
Zečević hails from Kragujevac, Serbia. He played for the KK Radnički KG 06 junior team between 2009 and 2012.

High school and college career
Zečević played high school basketball at Asbury High School in Albertville, Alabama. He attended Lee Academy prep school in Lee, Maine. Zečević played NCAA Division I college basketball at Bradley University in Peoria, Illinois, during the 2013–14 season. He transferred to Hill College in Hillsboro, Texas, where he played the 2014–15 season. Zečević played from 2015 to 2017 at Keiser University in West Palm Beach, Florida.

Professional career 
In August 2018, Zečević signed with Éanna for the 2018–19 Irish National League Division 1. He helped them win the championship and earn promotion to the Super League.

During the 2019–20 Irish Super League season, Zečević averaged 21.13 points, 9.26 rebounds and 2.43 assists per game. He was twice named Player of the Month and subsequently earned Super League All-Star First Team honours.

Zečević returned to Éanna in 2021. He went on to earn Super League All-Star Second Team honours in 2021–22.

References

External links
Stefan Zečević at eurobasket.com
Stefan Zečević at bradleybraves.com

1993 births
Living people
Bradley Braves men's basketball players
Serbian expatriate basketball people in Ireland
Serbian expatriate basketball people in the United States
Serbian men's basketball players
Small forwards